Infierno en el Ring (2008) (Spanish for "Inferno in the ring") was a professional wrestling Pay-Per-View (PPV) produced by Consejo Mundial de Lucha Libre (CMLL), which took place on June 13, 2008 in Arena México, Mexico City, Mexico. The main event was the eponymous Infierno en el Ring match that CMLL traditionally holds at least once a year. In 2008 the match was given its own event, whereas previously it had been a part of other events. The Infierno en el Ring match is a multi-man Steel Cage match where all the competitors risked their hair, with the last wrestler in the ring being shaved bald. The 2008 event saw ten men risk their hair: Heavy Metal, El Texano Jr., Damián 666, Mr. Águila, El Terrible, Perro Aguayo Jr., Shocker, Marco Corleone, Negro Casas and Alex Koslov. The event also featured 5 Six-man "Lucha Libre rules" tag team match, including the finals of a tournament to determine the next holders of the CMLL World Trios Championship as Los Ángleles (Spanish for "The Angels; Héctor Garza, El Hijo del Fantasma and La Máscara faced Blue Panther, Dos Caras Jr. and Místico.

Production

Background
The Mexican wrestling company Consejo Mundial de Lucha Libre (Spanish for "World Wrestling Council"; CMLL) has held a number of major shows over the years using the moniker Infierno en el Ring ("Inferno in the Ring"), all of which were main evented by a multi-man steel cage match, the eponymous Infierno en el Ring match. CMLL has use the Infierno en el Ring match on other shows, but will intermittently hold a show billed specifically as Infierno en el Ring, with the first such show held in 2008. It is not an annually recurring show, but instead held intermittently sometimes several years apart and not always in the same month of the year either. All Infierno en el Ring shows have been held in Arena México in Mexico City, Mexico which is CMLL's main venue, its "home". Traditionally CMLL holds their major events on Friday Nights, which means the Infierno en el Ring shows replace their regularly scheduled Super Viernes show. The 2008 Infierno en el Ring show was the first show to use the name.

Storylines
The event featured five professional wrestling matches with different wrestlers involved in pre-existing scripted feuds, plots and storylines. Wrestlers were portrayed as either heels (referred to as rudos in Mexico, those that portray the "bad guys") or faces (técnicos in Mexico, the "good guy" characters) as they followed a series of tension-building events, which culminated in a wrestling match or series of matches.

Results

Infierno en el Ring order of escape

References

General result references

Specific references

2008 in professional wrestling
CMLL Infierno en el Ring
Events in Mexico City
June 2008 events in Mexico
2008 in Mexico